{{Infobox sportsperson
| headercolor = 
| name = Oksana Masters
| image = Oksana Masters mixed sculls final 2012 crop.png
| image_size = 
| caption = Masters at 2012 Summer Paralympic Games
| birth_name = Oksana Alexandrovna Bondarchuk
| fullname = 
| nickname = 
| native_name = 
| native_name_lang = Ukrainian
| nationality = American
| birth_date = 
| birth_place = Khmelnytskyi, Ukrainian SSR, Soviet Union
| death_date = 
| death_place = 
| height =  (2012)
| weight =  (2012)
| website = 
| country = USA
| sport = Adaptive rowing, Para-cycling, Cross-country skiing, Biathlon
| rank = 
| event = Mixed Sculls
| collegeteam = 
| universityteam = 
| club = 
| team = U.S. Paralympic
| turnedpro = 
| partner = Aaron Pike
| former_partner = 
| coach = Justin Lednar, Bob Hurley, Roger Payne, Brad Alan Lewis
| retired = 
| coaching = 
| worlds = 
| regionals = 
| nationals = 
| olympics = 
| paralympics = 2012 Summer Paralympics:  Trunk and arms mixed double sculls – Bronze, 2014 Winter Paralympics''': Nordic Ski Cross Country – Silver & Bronze and Biathlon, 2016 Summer Paralympics: Cycling
| highestranking = 
| pb = 
| medaltemplates = 

| show-medals = 
| updated = March 4, 2022
}}Oksana Masters' (born June 19, 1989) is an American multi-sport Paralympic athlete of Ukrainian descent from Louisville, Kentucky. Having primarily specialized in rowing and cross-country skiing, she won the first ever United States medal in trunk and arms mixed double sculls at the 2012 Summer Paralympics in London. She was also a part of the U.S. Nordic skiing team at the 2014 Winter Paralympics and the 2018 Winter Paralympics. She won two Paralympic medals in 2014 and five Paralympic medals in 2018, including two gold. She switched to para-cycling after the 2012 Paralympics and competed at the 2016 and 2020 Summer Paralympics, winning two gold medals at the latter. She competed at the 2022 Winter Paralympics, winning a gold medal in Biathlon – Women's 6 kilometres, sitting.

Early life
Oksana was born in 1989, three years after the Chernobyl nuclear disaster, with several radiation-induced birth defects, including tibial hemimelia (resulting in different leg lengths), missing weight-bearing shinbones in her calves, webbed fingers with no thumbs, and six toes on each foot. She was abandoned by her birth parents at a Ukrainian orphanage where she lived until age 7. After she turned 7, Oksana was adopted by Gay Masters, an unmarried American speech therapy professor with no biological children.

After moving to the United States in 1997, both of Oksana's legs were eventually amputated above the knee—her left leg at age nine and her right leg at age 14—as they became increasingly painful and unable to support her weight. Oksana also had surgery to modify her innermost fingers on each hand so they could function as thumbs.

When she arrived in the U.S., her mother was a professor at the University at Buffalo; she moved to Louisville, Kentucky in 2001 when her mother took a faculty position at the University of Louisville, and graduated from the city's Atherton High School in 2008.

Rowing career
 
Masters began adaptive rowing in 2002 at age 13, shortly before her right leg was amputated. She continued afterward and began adaptive rowing competitively. In 2010, she competed at the CRASH-B Sprints, setting a world record in the process. She was also the first adaptive sculler to compete in the Indianapolis Rowing Club "Head of the Eagle" regatta, winning the women's open singles event in the process.

In 2011, Masters and teammate Augusto Perez placed second at the Adaptive World Championship trials in West Windsor, New Jersey.

In preparation for the 2012 London Paralympic Games, Masters teamed with Rob Jones, a United States Marine Corps veteran who lost both legs to an IED explosion in Afghanistan. Masters and Jones called themselves "Team Bad Company" and proceeded to win both the Adaptive World Championships Trials and the Final Paralympic Qualification Regatta by substantial margins.

On September 2, at the 2012 London Paralympics, Masters and Jones finished third—winning the first-ever United States medal (bronze) in trunk and arms mixed double sculls with a final time of 4:05.56. They finished behind China (gold) and France (silver) while just edging out Great Britain.

Due to a back injury, Masters has given up competitive rowing since winning a bronze medal at the 2012 London Paralympics. She has since taken up para-cycling and cross country skiing.

Cross-country skiing career
 
Following her medal win in rowing at the 2012 Paralympics, Masters took up cross-country skiing. At the 2014 Winter Paralympics in Sochi, Russia, she won a silver medal in the 12 km Nordic and a bronze medal in the 5 km Nordic. She also placed fourth and eighth in two biathlon events. Masters sustained a back injury during this time and gave up rowing as a result. She took up cycling as part of the recovery process.

Masters won her first Paralympic gold medal at the 2018 Winter Paralympics in the cross-country skiing women's 1.5 km sprint classical event after experiencing multiple setbacks. She had injured her elbow three weeks prior to the Games and had also withdrawn from a biathlon event the day before after falling during the race. She won five medals total from those Games, three in cross-country and two in biathlon. She won the gold medal in the cross-country skiing's 5 km sitting event and the bronze medal in the cross-country skiing's 12 km sitting event. She won silver medals in the 6 km sitting biathlon event and the 12.5 km sitting biathlon event.

Masters won the silver medal in the women's 6km sitting biathlon event at the 2021 World Para Snow Sports Championships held in Lillehammer, Norway. She also won the bronze medal in the women's 10km sitting biathlon event. In cross-country skiing, she won the gold medal in the women's long-distance sitting event.

Masters won her first Paralympic gold medal in biathlon at the 2022 Winter Paralympics in the 6 km sitting biathlon event.

Masters has twice been nominated for an ESPY for her Nordic skiing in the category of Best Female Athlete with a Disability.

Cycling career
Masters has won two bronze World Cup medals and a bronze medal at the UCI Para-Cycling Worlds. She competed in hand-cycling events in the 2016 Paralympic Games in Rio, where she placed 4th in the road race event and 5th in the timed trial. At the 2020 Paralympic Games in Tokyo she finished first in the time trial and the road race, her first Paralympic gold medals at the Summer Games.

Media appearances
Masters' life story has been featured in a number of media sources, including Spirit, Southwest Airlines' in-flight magazine and Sports Illustrated. She was also named one of the "11 Hottest Paralympic Athletes" by msn NOW, was named one of ten U.S. athletes to watch by The Guardian, and posed nude for ESPN The Magazine's'' annual "Body Issue". Apple featured her in a "Making a difference. One app at a time." video, where she explains how her life changed with iOS apps.

References

External links 

 
 
 
 

1989 births
Living people
American female rowers
Paralympic gold medalists for the United States
Paralympic silver medalists for the United States
Paralympic bronze medalists for the United States
Rowers at the 2012 Summer Paralympics
Sportspeople from Khmelnytskyi, Ukraine
Paralympic rowers of the United States
Sportspeople from Louisville, Kentucky
American adoptees
American amputees
American disabled sportspeople
Ukrainian emigrants to the United States
Atherton High School alumni
Cross-country skiers at the 2014 Winter Paralympics
Cross-country skiers at the 2018 Winter Paralympics
Cross-country skiers at the 2022 Winter Paralympics
Biathletes at the 2014 Winter Paralympics
Biathletes at the 2018 Winter Paralympics
Biathletes at the 2022 Winter Paralympics
Medalists at the 2014 Winter Paralympics
Medalists at the 2018 Winter Paralympics
Medalists at the 2022 Winter Paralympics
Medalists at the 2012 Summer Paralympics
Medalists at the 2020 Summer Paralympics
Paralympic cyclists of the United States
Cyclists at the 2016 Summer Paralympics
Cyclists at the 2020 Summer Paralympics
American female cyclists
American female biathletes
Paralympic biathletes of the United States
Paralympic cross-country skiers of the United States
Laureus World Sports Awards winners
Paralympic medalists in cross-country skiing
Paralympic medalists in biathlon
Paralympic medalists in cycling
Paralympic medalists in rowing
DeVry University alumni
21st-century American women
People with polydactyly
Cyclists from Kentucky
20th-century American women